Sean Maguire (born 1976) is an English actor and singer.

Sean Maguire or McGuire may also refer to:

People
Sean Maguire (footballer) (born 1994), Irish footballer
Sean Maguire (American football) (born 1994), American football player
Sean MacGuire, creator of the computer network monitoring application Big Brother
Sean McGuire (fiddler) (1927–2005), Irish fiddler
Sean McGuire (Canadian football) (born 1996), Canadian football player

Other
Sean Maguire (album), a 1994 album released by the English actor and singer
Sean MacGuire, a supporting character in the video game Red Dead Redemption 2
Sean Maguire, a character played by Robin Williams in Good Will Hunting